Guadalupe is the third-largest city in the state of Zacatecas in Mexico. It lies adjacent to the east side of the city of Zacatecas and is a component of the Zacatecas-Guadalupe metropolitan area. The  town had a 2018 census population of 215,000 inhabitants and serves as municipal seat of the municipality of Guadalupe.

References
Link to tables of population data from Census of 2005 INEGI: Instituto Nacional de Estadística, Geografía e Informática
Zacatecas Enciclopedia de los Municipios de México

External links
Official website

Populated places in Zacatecas
Camino Real de Tierra Adentro